Page is an occupational surname derived from page. It may refer to:

People
 Alan Page (born 1945), American football player and judge
 Alfred Page (Australian politician) (1843–1911), member of the Tasmanian Legislative Council
 Alfred R. Page (1859–1931), American lawyer and politician from New York
 Alfred Page (priest) (1912–1988), Archdeacon of Leeds
 Anita Page (1910–2008), film actress of the 1930s
 Annette Page (1932–2017), English ballerina
 Arthur W. Page (1883–1960), early practitioner of public relations
 Bettie Page (1923–2008), U.S. pinup model
 Bob Page (disambiguation)
 Charles Page (disambiguation)
 Chris Page, radio presenter
 Christopher Page (born 1952), scholar on medieval music
 Christopher Nigel Page (born 1942), Scottish botanist
 Clarence Page (born 1947), newspaper columnist
 Cleo Page (1928–1979), American blues guitarist and singer
 Denys Page, (1908–1978) British classical scholar
 Diamond Dallas Page (born 1956), American professional wrestler and actor
 Diana Page (born 1965), South African artist
 Don Page (physicist) (born 1948), American-born Canadian theoretical physicist 
 Dorothy Page (actress) (1904–1961), American actress
 Dorothy Page (historian), New Zealand historian
 E. M. Page (Everill Max Page, 1893–1957) Oregon Supreme Court justice
 Earle Page (1880–1961), 11th Prime Minister of Australia
 Elliot Page (born 1987), Canadian actor
 Emily Rebecca Page (1823–1908), American poet
 Ernie Page (politician) (1935–2018), Australian politician
 Frank Page (broadcaster) (1925–2013), American radio personality 
 Frederick Page (1917–2005), English aircraft designer
 Frederick Handley Page (1885–1962), British aircraft manufacturer
 Geneviève Page (born 1930), French actress
 Geoffrey Page (1920–2000), Royal Air Force pilot
 George Page (disambiguation)
 Geraldine Page (1924–1987), American actress
 Glenys Page (1940–2012), New Zealand cricketer
 Greg Page (disambiguation), including people named Gregory
 Ian Page (singer) (born 1960), British singer and author
 Ian Page (conductor) (born 1963), British conductor
 Jack Page (disambiguation)
 James Page (disambiguation), including people named Jim or Jimmy
 Jennifer Page (born 1944), former Chief Executive of the London Millennium Dome
 Jimmy Page (born 1944), musician with Led Zeppelin
 Joanna Page (born 1977), Welsh actress 
 John Page (disambiguation)
 Joy Page (1924–2008), American actress
 Katie Page (born 1956), Australian CEO of Harvey Norman
 Kimberly Page (born 1970), American professional wrestling valet and actress
 Larcena Pennington Page (1837–1913), American female pioneer
 Larry Page (born 1973), co-founder of Google
 Larry Page (singer and manager) (born c. 1938)
 Leigh Page (1884–1952), American physicist
 Malcolm Page (disambiguation)
 Mary Boomer Page, Chicago educator
 Michael Page (disambiguation)
 Neil Page (born 1944), former Australian baseball representative
 Norman Page (died 1935), English actor
 Oran Page (1908–1954), American jazz musician
 P. K. Page (1916–2010), Canadian writer
 Patti Page (1927–2013), American singer
 Regé-Jean Page, British actor
 Richard Page (disambiguation)
 Robert Page (disambiguation)
 Roy M. Page (1890–1958), New York politician
 Rutherford Page (c. 1880–1912), early aviator
 Simon C. Page, British graphic designer
 Samuel Page, American actor
 Stephen Page (born 1965), Australian dancer and choreographer
 Steven Page (born 1970), Canadian musician
 Thomas Page (disambiguation), including people named Tom or Tommy
 Tim Page (disambiguation)
 Val Page (1892–1978), British motorcycle designer
 William Page (disambiguation)
 Page (Surrey cricketer), 18th century English cricketer (first name not known)

Fictional characters
 Bob Page, a character in the computer game Deus Ex
 Sally Jones / Alison Page, a character in the 1997 American martial arts comedy movie Beverly Hills Ninja
 Valerie Page, from the comic book series V for Vendetta
 Victoria Page, in the Dream Theater concept album Metropolis Pt. 2: Scenes from a Memory
Wilf and Wilma Page, characters in the Oxford University Press series The Magic Key by Roderick Hunt and Alex Brychta

Pseudonyms
 H. A. Page, one of several pseudonyms used by the Scottish author Alexander Hay Japp

See also
 Frédéric Pagès (born 1950), French journalist and humorist
 Pagé
 Paige (name)
 Pagan (disambiguation)

English-language surnames
Occupational surnames
English-language occupational surnames